Gargela chrysias is a moth in the family Crambidae. It was described by Edward Meyrick in 1897. It is found on Ambon Island in Indonesia.

References

Crambinae
Moths described in 1897
Moths of Indonesia